Satyam is a surname. Notable people with the surname include:

 Chellapilla Satyam (1933–1989), Indian music director
 Madhavapeddi Satyam (1922–2000), Indian Telugu singer and actor
 Vempati Chinna Satyam (1929–2012), Indian dancer